Leonardo Ivkic (born 30 January 2003) is an Austrian professional footballer who plays as a right-back for Young Violets, the reserve squad of Austria Wien.

Career
Ivkic is a youth product of SK Cro-Vienna and Wiener Linien, before joining Austria Wien's youth academy in 2017. He was promoted to their reserves and eventually senior team in 2021. He signed his first professional contract with Austria Wien on 3 July 2021. He made his professional debut with Austria Wien in a 1–1 Austrian Football Bundesliga tie with WSG Tirol on 1 August 2021.

International career
Born in Austria, Ivkic is of Croatian descent. He represented the Croatia U14s twice in 2017, before switching to represent Austria. Ivkic played for all the Austrian youth levels from U15 to U21, and represented the Austria U19s at the 2022 UEFA European Under-19 Championship.

References

External links
 
 OEFB Profile
 

2003 births
Living people
Footballers from Vienna
Austrian footballers
Austria under-21 international footballers
Austria youth international footballers
Croatian footballers
Croatia youth international footballers
Austrian people of Croatian descent
FK Austria Wien players
Austrian Football Bundesliga players
2. Liga (Austria) players
Austrian Regionalliga players
Association football fullbacks